Frances Ledlie Dawson (December 23, 1903 – August 20, 1995) was an American educator and politician.

Dawson was born in Des Moines, Iowa. She received her bachelor's degree from Simpson College and her master's degree from Northwestern University. Dawson lived with her husband Horace Dawson and their family in Evanston, Illinois since 1929. She taught history and political science. Dawson served on the Evanston High School Board of Education and the Evanston Planning Commission. Dawson served in the Illinois House of Representatives from 1957 to 1971 and was a Republican. Dawson died at the Presbyterian Home in Evanston, Illinois.

Notes

External links

1903 births
1995 deaths
Politicians from Des Moines, Iowa
People from Evanston, Illinois
Northwestern University alumni
Simpson College alumni
Educators from Illinois
American women educators
Women state legislators in Illinois
School board members in Illinois
Republican Party members of the Illinois House of Representatives
20th-century American politicians
20th-century American women politicians